Sarin Chhak (2 January 1922 – 1979) was a Cambodian statesman and diplomat who served as Minister of Foreign Affairs from 1975 to 1976. He died in 1979 in Vietnamese custody following the Vietnamese invasion of Cambodia.

He was an expert in borders. He graduated with a PhD from the University of Paris in 1966 with his thesis titled Les frontières du Cambodge (The Borders of Cambodia).

References

1922 births
1979 deaths
Cambodian diplomats
Cambodian expatriates in France 
Cambodian people imprisoned abroad 
Foreign ministers of Cambodia
Knights Grand Cross of the Royal Order of Cambodia
People from Takéo province
Prisoners and detainees of Vietnam  
Royal University of Phnom Penh alumni
Sangkum politicians 
University of Paris alumni